The 2019 Acura Sports Car Challenge of Mid-Ohio was a sports car race sanctioned by the International Motor Sports Association (IMSA). The race was held at Mid-Ohio Sports Car Course in Lexington, Ohio, and was the fourth round of the 2019 WeatherTech SportsCar Championship.

Background
This event marks the inaugural event of a new support championship for the GT Daytona (GTD) class called the WeatherTech Sprint Cup. It is a championship of all the non-endurance events in the GTD calendar, using the same scoring system as the overall full-time championship, unlike its sister support championship, the Michelin Endurance Cup.

Two and a half weeks prior to the event, Ford announced they would end their factory program with Chip Ganassi Racing in the GTLM class in both the World Endurance Championship and the WeatherTech championship at the end of 2019.

On April 24th, 2019, IMSA released a technical bulletin regarding the Balance of Performance for the race. There were no changes made to either the DPi or GT Le Mans classes. In GTD, the Lamborghini Huracán GT3, which had been victorious in the previous two rounds at Daytona and Sebring, received a 30 kilogram weight increase and a 1-liter reduction in fuel capacity. In contrast, the Audi R8 LMS and Mercedes-AMG GT3 cars were given weight reductions of 25 and 20 kilograms, respectively. The McLaren 720S GT3 received its baseline weight of 1320 kilograms and RPM of 8,000 for its first IMSA event.

Entries

On April 24th, 2019, the entry list for the event was released, featuring a total of 36 cars. There are scheduled to be 11 cars in the leading Daytona Prototype international (DPi) class, two in the Le Mans Prototype 2 (LMP2) class, eight entries in GT Le Mans (GTLM), and 15 entries in the GTD class.

There were some considerable additions and changes among the field. Lone Star Racing returned to IMSA competition in the GTD class, having previously participated at Laguna Seca in 2017. Starworks Motorsport driver Parker Chase, who had previously only been on contract for the endurance events, would sign an agreement to run the full season with Starworks in 2019, alongside the existing full-season driver Ryan Dalziel. The biggest addition to the entry list, however, was Compass Racing, who would field a new McLaren 720S GT3 with factory backing in the full Sprint Cup-only campaign for the season. Their drivers were McLaren factory driver Paul Holton and Matt Plumb. On April 19th, 2019, McLaren Automotive signed a multi-year agreement with IMSA in which they officially became an automotive partner of the International Motor Sports Association.

After initially confirming full-season programs, GTD teams Precision Performance Motorsports and P1 Motorsports would not return for Mid-Ohio, with the latter pulling the plug on using their Mercedes-AMG GT3 cars in championships.

Due to scheduling conflicts for full-season drivers Gabriel Aubry, Patrick Lindsey and Harry Tincknell, who were at Circuit de Spa-Francorchamps for the FIA World Endurance Championship, drivers Eric Lux, Marco Seefried and Ryan Hunter-Reay respectively would replace these drivers for the Mid-Ohio event.

Practice and qualifying

Qualifying Results 

Results

References

External links

Sports Car Challenge of Mid-Ohio
Sports Car Challenge of Mid-Ohio
Sports Car Challenge of Mid-Ohio
Sports Car Challenge of Mid-Ohio